Harrison Avenue Bridge was a concrete deck arch bridge carrying Harrison Avenue (unsigned SR 6011) in Scranton, Pennsylvania, United States. Its three spans included an open-spandrel ribbed arch over Roaring Brook, flanked by two closed-spandrel arches. The southwestern closed-spandrel arch spanned the former Lackawanna and Wyoming Valley Railroad (Laurel Line), converted to highway use in 1964 as the Central Scranton Expressway. The northeastern closed-spandrel arch spans the former Delaware, Lackawanna and Western Railroad, now a heritage railroad operated by Steamtown National Historic Site.

Built in 1921–1922, the bridge was notable as an example of Progressive Era civic involvement, its construction having been promoted by a citizens' group called the South to East Scranton Bridge Association. It was designed by New York City-based consulting engineer Abraham Burton Cohen, although Scranton Department of Public Works chief engineer William A. Schunk and his assistant Charles F. Schroeder were more actively involved in day-to-day supervision of construction. The bridge was listed on the National Register of Historic Places in 1988.

Construction of a replacement bridge on a parallel alignment began in October 2014 and was completed in December 2017. The old bridge was demolished in June 2018.

See also
List of bridges documented by the Historic American Engineering Record in Pennsylvania
List of bridges on the National Register of Historic Places in Pennsylvania
National Register of Historic Places listings in Lackawanna County, Pennsylvania

References

External links

Anthracite Bridge Company information at Structurae

Bridges completed in 1922
Road bridges on the National Register of Historic Places in Pennsylvania
Buildings and structures in Scranton, Pennsylvania
Bridges in Lackawanna County, Pennsylvania
Historic American Engineering Record in Pennsylvania
National Register of Historic Places in Lackawanna County, Pennsylvania
Concrete bridges in the United States
Open-spandrel deck arch bridges in the United States
1922 establishments in Pennsylvania